Wee Kheng Chiang (1890–1978) was a Malaysian Chinese businessman of Quemoy Bân-lâm Hokkien ancestry who founded the United Chinese Bank (now United Overseas Bank). He is the father of Wee Cho Yaw, Chairman Emeritus & Adviser of the United Overseas Bank.

Early life 
Wee was born to Hokkiens (Minnanese) with ancestry from Quemoy island on 22 July 1890 in Kuching, Sarawak (now part of Malaysia), a British established puppet colony. He was the family's second-to-eldest son. His father was Wee Tee Yah (died 1889), and his mother was Song Kim Keow, a local born widow. The younger Wee attended Saint Thomas Secondary School, and spoke Hokkien and English fluently.

Career 
In 1924, Wee established the Bian Chiang Bank (now known as CIMB Group) in Kuching, Malaysia. In 1975, Fleet Group Sdn Bhd bought a 100% stake in Bian Chiang Bank, making the bank a wholly owned unit of the Fleet group. Subsequently, the bank moved its headquarters to Kuala Lumpur from Kuching. 

He became the Treasurer of the Kuching-based Chinese General Chamber of Commerce upon its inception in 1930, before being promoted to president. In addition, Wee was the Hokkien Association (福建会馆)'s President.

In 1931, he was elected as Chairman of the Sarawak Chinese Chamber of Commerce. He resigned from the post in 1946.

On 6 August 1935, he established the United Chinese Bank with six other partners. The bank is now known as the United Overseas Bank (UOB).

Wee staffed his bank with Hokkiens to serve his Hokkien clients.

Personal life 
The Kapitan Cina Ong Tiang Swee, who was then Kuching's wealthiest person, was impressed by Wee, and decided to let him marry his eldest daughter, Ong Siew Eng. Wee was then given the role of manager of the Sarawak Chinese Bank, which Ong owned. Wee soon got to know more prominent businesspeople and other important figures; he shortly started a string of businesses, including farming and goods importing and exporting.

He was married twice and had fifteen children (five sons and ten daughters). Wee's second wife is the mother of Wee Cho Yaw, chairman of Singapore's United Overseas Bank.

Death and legacy 
In 1978, Wee died in his Kuching residence. His fourth son, Wee Cho Yaw, was subsequently appointed to head United Overseas Bank. Jalan Datuk Wee Kheng Chiang, a road in downtown Kuching, is named after him.

Awards 
Wee Kheng Chiang was posthumously hailed as the "uncrowned king of Sarawak" in Queen of the Head Hunters by Rajah Vyner Brooke's spouse, Sylvia Brooke. Ranee Sylvia Brooke also used this sobriquet, in her 1939 book The Three White Rajahs.

In 1941, Wee was presented with the Commander of the Star of Sarawak by the Third White Rajah of Sarawak. In 1964, he was awarded the Panglima Negara Bintang Sarawak by the first Governor of Sarawak.

Affiliations 
 The Sarawak Chinese Chamber of Commerce (1930–1946)
 The Hokkien Association (1932–1947)
 The Singapore-Sarawak Association (from 1930)
 The Hokkien School Management Board (1932–1947)
 The Sarawak China Relief Fund Committee (1938)
 Kuching Joint Primary and Secondary Schools Management Board (1946)
 Kuching China Consulate Building Committee (1949)
 Anti-Tuberculosis Society
 Sarawak Turf Club (1937)
 Sarawak Buddhist Society
 Tse Chia Koh Buddhist Association
 Kuching Hung Nam Shieng Thang
 Sarawak Tong Sin Siang Tong Association
 The Federation of Wee Clan Associations, Sarawak

References

Bibliography 
 

Hokkien businesspeople
20th-century Malaysian businesspeople
Malaysian people of Hokkien descent
Malaysian people of Chinese descent
1890 births
1978 deaths
People from Kuching